Panagiotis Pelekoudas (born 8 November 1989) is a Greek male volleyball player. He is part of the Greece men's national volleyball team.

References

External links
 profile at FIVB.org
 profile at greekvolley.gr
 

1989 births
Living people
Greek men's volleyball players
E.A. Patras players
Iraklis V.C. players
Olympiacos S.C. players
PAOK V.C. players
Panathinaikos V.C. players
Sportspeople from Patras
Competitors at the 2018 Mediterranean Games
Mediterranean Games bronze medalists for Greece
Mediterranean Games medalists in volleyball